"Piggyback" (stylized in all caps) is a song recorded by American singer Melanie Martinez. It was independently released for streaming on her SoundCloud account on December 22, 2017, following a controversy between Martinez and Timothy Heller. The latter, a person with whom the singer once shared a friendship, accused her via Twitter of sexually assaulting and raping them. Various music critics associated the lyrics of "Piggyback" with the incident. Over an electronic arrangement, Martinez references her journey as an artist and the fake people she had met in her life. Critics interpreted the track's refrain as a response to Heller's accusations.

Background and release
In early December 2017, Timothy Heller, a woman with whom Melanie Martinez once shared a friendship, accused the latter via Twitter of sexually assaulting and raping her. In response to Heller's accusations, Martinez tweeted that the allegations "horrified and saddened" her and that Heller "never said no to what they chose to do together", insinuating that she believed there was consent. The singer subsequently released a second statement, thanking her fans for pointing out Heller's "false statements" and that she would "never be intimate with someone without their absolute consent." In less than 20 days after the incident, Martinez wrote and recorded "Piggyback". She independently released the song for streaming as a single on her SoundCloud account on December 22, 2017, lasting three minutes and 27 seconds.

Lyrical interpretation

Music critics believed that "Piggyback" revolved around the accusations Heller made towards Martinez. PopCrush Lai Frances thought that the singer was additionally referencing "'fake' and 'plastic' people she's met in her life". The song begins with Martinez detailing her journey as an artist over a "simple" electronic arrangement: "Trusted too many fake people while I was still young. Gave them the benefit of the doubt, I was so wrong." According to Mike Wass of Idolator, Martinez responds to the aforementioned accusations in the refrain: "I'm so done with playing piggyback, swear to god I wished y'all all the best. You're lying your way to try and gain a piece of me when you could never come close cause I know my destiny." Other lyrics of the track include: "I worked hard for my shit, put my love in this shit. Now you're trying to kill my name for some fame, what is this?"

Track listing

Release history

Notes

References

Melanie Martinez songs
Songs written by Melanie Martinez
2017 songs
2017 singles
Songs about sexual assault
American electronic songs
Songs about musicians
Songs about friendship
Songs about childhood
Songs about New York City